Tizi-n-Aït tracksite is a fossil trackway location in Morocco in the Azilal province. It is Jurassic (Pliensbachian, 189.6 - 183.0 Ma) in age, with tracks attributed to sauropods or stegosaurs, and an unidentified carnosaur. The tracksite is part of the Aganane Formation and the tracks are located at base of formation.

References

Mesozoic paleontological sites of Africa
Jurassic paleontological sites